The rank insignia of the federal armed forces of the Federal Republic of Germany indicate rank and branch of service in the German Army, German Air Force, or the German Navy.

They are regulated by the "presidential order on rank designation and military uniform".
The '' ( - Central Service Provision) gives the dress order and design variations. Further, the Federal Office of Equipment, IT, and In-Service Support of the Bundeswehr provides numerous details.

Types
According to the rank system, the different types of rank insignias might be distinguished as follows:
Shoulder straps or boards
Cuff titles or sleeve insignias
Mounting loops or straps (in de: Aufziehschlaufen)

Basic structure of shoulder straps and sleeve insignias
The rank insignias of all service personnel will be explained initially on the example of shoulder straps to the basic uniform or everyday uniform in order provide a general overview.

As to naval persons in uniform there will be additionally depicted sleeve insignias on the uniform jacket. Pertaining army persons in uniform there will be shown next shoulder straps of the uniform jacket. Variations of the first instance depicted rank insignias will be explained in more detail.

Commissioned officer ranks
The rank insignia of commissioned officers.

Other ranks
The rank insignia of non-commissioned officers and enlisted personnel.

Variations
Army- and Air Force persons in uniform of the commissioned officers rank group may carry in line with ZDv 37/10 self-procured hand stitched rank insignias (image: d.) instead of the metallic version (image: e.). However, this type of rank insignias is rather seldom in practice. Beside the rank insignia on light-grey shoulder straps, as shown above, there is to army persons in uniform a version (see image a.) on dark grey cloth. This version of shoulder straps will be worn to uniform shirt and overcoat.

Naval persons in uniform, of the enlisted personnel rank group, wear relatively seldom the dark blue jacket with the above indicated cuff titles, because enlisted mariner in the age below 30 years prefer to wear the white shirt or blue shirt instead of the uniform jacked. Sleeve insignias on shirts more simple, but pertaining form and dimensions identically to those on jackets.

In the place of stripes, with parts of metallic spinning fibers wire yarn, the oblique chevrons are made from golden-yellow or steel-blue spinning fibers without any metallic parts of wire yarn (see images b and c.). For Army and Air Force personnel in Bundeswehr dress uniform, as well as for all female soldiers, shoulder straps are mandatory. However, male naval persons in uniform wear cuff titles, known from the jacket.

Particularities
Deviating from the description above, naval enlisted personnel of the Guard Battalion of the MOD-Germany (de: Wachbataillon beim BMVg) are exempted from wearing any sleeve rating mark on all uniforms, instead wearing their insignia on shoulder boards.

In opposition to the ZDv 37/10, in representative military units (e.g. Guard Battalion of the MOD-Germany and Staff Military Band of the Armed Forces) for enlisted personnel and non commissioned officers the background of the basic uniform gorget patches shows the specific corps colour of the appropriate armed service, special troop, corps or assignment.

Also in deviation from the description above, on the service jacket and skiing blouse colour pipings or cops background colour on gorget patches are dropped.

Basic form of mounting straps
Mounting straps or loops ( in German) are in principle identical to the design of the epaulettes depicted above. From this point of view it is sufficient to demonstrate the different versions of the design, instead of showing a complete list. Officially-procured mounting straps are weaved. The field-uniform type of mounting straps, used most, have black or golden emblems on stone-grey/olive-coloured base textiles. Soldiers of the lowest ranks generally do not wear shoulder straps. Exceptions to this are comparatively-low-ranked sub-officers, Mate aspirants, and Boatswain aspirants, as well as wearers of stone-grey/olive Luftwaffe uniforms that do not feature badges with the double wings.

Variations which conform to regulations
Similar mounting straps exist for differently-coloured uniform parts as well as for Army, Air Force, and Navy personnel in uniform. Army personnel in uniform, for example, wear black mounting straps with bright-grey emblems (gold-yellow for Generals) on the epaulettes of grey shirts (see image a.).

For naval personnel, dark-blue mounting straps are widespread, particularly on the ship-parka (see image c.).

For Air Force pilots' flying suits there exists a version of the mounting straps with bright-grey emblems (gold-yellow for Generals) on dark-blue base textile (without double-wing). The Air Force double-wing is mounted to other parts of the flying suit, and is intentionally omitted on mounting straps.

Versions being phased out 
By amendment of the "Presidential Order on Rank Designation and Uniform of Soldiers" on February 7, 1996, it was decided that the silver-coloured rank insignia on the camouflage fighting suit (de: Kampfanzug Tarndruck) would become obsolete. They will be replaced by black-coloured ones.

According to the ZDv 37/10, ”Until official procurement of the newly designed olive-green mounting loops with black-coloured rank insignias (for enlisted personnel, non commissioned officers, and commissioned officers including colonels of the Heer and Luftwaffe), the old-fashioned mounting loop with grey-colour rank insignias may be worn."

In practice, the replacement of the obsolete grey-coloured mounting loops by the new fashioned black-colour version is almost complete. However, on uni-coloured flying suits of army pilots and aviation technicians, mounting loops with grey-coloured rank insignias conform to the regulations.

Tolerated versions 
The following tables below depict mounting loops that are used in practice in conjunction with the 3- or 5 colour flecktarn fighting suit. However, these particular versions are not mentioned or depicted in the ZDv 37/10, nor are they officially procured. Mounting loops in 3- and 5-colour flecktarn are de facto in contravention of the Presidential Order on Rank Designation and Uniform of Soldiers, and may be only procured individually. However, the mounting loops in 3- and 5 colour flecktarn with black-, grey- or yellow-coloured emblems depicted below are tolerated and worn up to highest rank groups and grades. 
In service, some black-colour emblems, e.g. for the feldwebel grades, lieutenant, or major, might not be very visible.

Additional elements
As illustrated above, all rank insignias come with a number of diverse additional elements. In most cases they characterize a rank or career group within the Bundeswehr. Additional elements are not components of the rank insignia, because the rank or grade level is clearly defined by the rank insignia itself. However, there are additional statuses not defined by these rank markings, such as being a licensed medical officer or a designated officer of NCO rank. These require additional elements to signify such status.

Double wing
The double wing (also: aviator wing) is part of the mounting loop of any Luftwaffe uniform. It is woven in the colour of all other emblems (in most cases: black (image b.) – or gold by general ranks (image c.)). The double wing, also part of other elements on aviator's uniform, unambiguously distinguishes stone-grey/olive Luftwaffe uniforms from those of the Army. Double wing mounting loops are longer and wider than any other in the Bundeswehr. The double wing is even part of the otherwise empty mounting loop of the lowest private OR1-rank (German: Flieger (flyer) or Kanonier (gunner); see image a.), in order to distinguish between the Luftwaffe and Army in flecktarn Battle Dress Uniform.

Corps colour 
Corps (or troop-function) colours ( in German) have been traditionally used in German armed forces since the 19th century. Corps-coloured piping and padding (4-mm-wide plain braiding) are  used on the uniforms of Army and Luftwaffe personnel, placed on shoulder straps and cuffs to characterize the membership of an armed service, a special force, or a particular assignment. Corps-coloured loops might be used on mounting straps of field uniform. The collar patches on uniform jackets show corps colours as well. It should be mentioned that the piping and padding on the shoulder (bottom part of the badge) is issued after boot camp and the beret is issued to the Corps that the wearer is currently serving in. Hence, the  can have a different colour to the beret since a soldier may have passed boot camp in another Corps than that which they currently serve in.
 Corps colours

Assignment badges 
Assignment badges of the German Navy are equivalent to the corps colours of the Army and Luftwaffe and have corresponding functions respectively.

Uniformed Naval personnel of enlisted and NCO rank wear specific marks of distinction or badges on epaulettes (not on mounting straps) and sleeves to characterize the appropriate assignment. The exception to this is officer-designated (OF(D)) grades.

As well as rank insignias on epaulettes, assignment badges are made up of metallic gold-coloured embossed pins or badges. Both are identical in colour and design. However, the assignment badges on sleeves are embroidered by hand or machine. Only the steel-blue assignment badges on white shirts of enlisted personnel are weaved. Seamen (recruit OR-1) wear assignment badges on shoulder straps or upper-sleeves that are otherwise empty. Assignment badges are normally positioned as follows:
Enlisted personnel: in the middle below of the rank insignia
NCOs with portepeed (sword knot): in the middle above of the rank insignia
Maat and Obermaat: in the middle of the square between the sets of stripes

Assignment badges on epaulettes are normally symmetric and placed between the head and rank insignia. The exception is for members of the Naval health service (assignment series 81), where the asymmetrical Rod of Asclepius is placed at the head.

Officers and designated officers

Army and Luftwaffe 
In the Army and Luftwaffe, the epaulettes of general ranks OF6 to OF9 on service uniform (basic design) and dress uniform are ornamented with a gold border made from metallic fabric (piping), as shown above. Field officer ranks (OF1 to OF5), including the officer designated grade  (Army: Senior Cadet Sergeant, Luftwaffe: Senior Aviation Cadet, Senior Warrant Officer (Br. Senior Acting Pilot Officer), Navy: Senior Midshipman), have silver-ornamented borders, also made from metallic fabric.

The metallic fabric ornamental border of the general ranks is made of fire-gilded silver wire. As for the field officer ranks, the ornamental border contains aluminium. A similar piping is employed on other uniform parts as well, e.g. on collar points of the service uniform jacket for officer ranks including  (Army and Luftwaffe), or on the peaked cap ( in German) or mountain cape.

Most officer designated ranks (Army and Luftwaffe) already have this particular silver metallic tissue border on epaulettes, next to the lower end of the mounting loop. The only exception to this is the Oberfähnrich shoulder strap, to be worn on service and dress uniform. This particular epaulette has the silver piping on its outline, indicating the officer's career, but lacks the bronze-coloured edging that usually borders the centre part of NCO-rank insignia, as opposed to the service uniform epaulettes of a Hauptfeldwebel (Staff Sergeant/First Sergeant, OR-7). However, rank badges on the mounting loops of Hauptfeldwebel and Oberfähnrich are identical.

Designated officers of OR-1 rank wear simple silver mounting loops on the otherwise empty epaulettes. A silver cord on the lower end of the mounting loop is usually worn in the Army. Alongside is another loop of corps colour, which indicates the membership to the appropriate branch of service, special force or assignment.
The visible, silver-coloured stripes are essential in order to differentiate from equivalent NCO ranks, because an officer candidate with the rank of "Fähnrich" (Army: Cadet Sergeant, Luftwaffe: Aviation Cadet, Warrant Officer, Navy: Midshipman) may not yet have professional knowledge about his future troop type, whose colours he is already wearing, as opposed to a "Feldwebel" (Sergeant, OR-6). This is an issue solely related to specific service requirements, since formally, these ranks (e.g. Fahnenjunker and Unteroffizier) do not differ in their position in the command chain.
OR5: Fahnenjunker versus Unteroffizier
OR6: Fähnrich versus Feldwebel
OR7: Oberfähnrich versus Hauptfeldwebel

Navy 
Regarding the Navy, apart from the rank insignia there are no additional elements given to all officer grades and officer designated ranks. Various assignment badges indicate the different officer chains of career and distinguish designated officers from other rank groups, e.g. enlisted ratings and NCOs. U-boat captains wear the traditional white hat. Examples of assignment badges dedicated to officer ranks are:
Military geographical service – a stylized globe with GEO written in the middle. 
Military musician service – a three-sided lyre.
Line officers and warrant officers – a five pointed nautical star (with the a single point at the top).

Assignment badges on shoulder straps are worn principally above the parallel gold-coloured galloons. They are designed as gold-coloured metallic stamped stickers in the style of the rank insignias of NCOs and enlisted men. The exception is weaved mounting loops, because not any assignment badge or career badge has to be worn on it.

Cuff assignment badges for officers are hand-embroidered and made from gold-coloured metallic fabric. In accordance with ZDv 37/10 on dark-blue epaulettes, hand-embroidered naval stars, made from gold-coloured metallic fabric, are tolerated as well.

As mentioned above, the nautical star identifies all officer dedicated ranks as well, with the exception of the medical career chain (see below).

Officers of the Medical Service including Officer Aspirants 
The speciality badge is different for medicine, dentistry, veterinary medicine and pharmacy. As mentioned above, it depicts the Rod of Asclepius. The head of the snake points forward, i.e. the direction the soldier is facing. This denotes personnel who are yet to finish their medical studies.

Feldwebel (Sergeant) Aspirant epaulettes include a bronze cord at the bottom of the strap as career indicator (Barely visible on some pictures; Click on Image to enlarge).

cadets

Aspirants, examination/course of instruction passed

Reservist Insignia (obsolete)
Reserve and retired servicemembers wore the insignia described below until August 2019, when the use of such was discontinued. Currently, reservists and retired personnel wear the same rank insignia as their active duty peers. The Army/Air Force wore a black-red-gold cord affixed to the shoulder loop, and naval personnel wore a letter "R" affixed as shown below.

 Navy

References

ZDv 37/10 Dress order to the soldiers of the Bundeswehr (de: "") (PDF; 3,5 MB)

 
Germany